Nile is an abandoned ghost town in Milam County, Texas, 9 miles west of Rockdale; it is named after the Nile River in Africa. Its population peaked at 35 in 1896, when it had two cotton gins and a general store. The school, which had 43 students in 1903, consolidated with Thorndale in 1946. Today, nothing remains of Nile.

References

Ghost towns in Central Texas
Ghost towns in Milam County, Texas